The Sydney Cricket Ground (SCG) is a sports stadium in Sydney. The ground hosted its first Test match in 1882. The first One Day International played at the ground was in 1979.

The Australian Percy McDonnell scored the first century at the ground in 1882 with 147 against England. 182 centuries have been scored in Tests at the ground in total. The highest score at the ground, 329 not out, was achieved by the Australian Michael Clarke on 5 January 2012 when he declared the Australian innings at 659/4. R. E. Foster 287 and Brian Lara 277 hold the 2nd and 3rd highest scores, respectively. Ricky Ponting has scored the most Test centuries at the ground with 6.

54 One Day International centuries have been scored at the ground. The first of these was scored by Geoff Boycott in 1979. Australia's Steve Smith holds the record for the highest score at the ground with 164. He has also scored the most One Day International centuries at the ground with 4 centuries.

Key
 * denotes that the batsman was not out.
 Inns. denotes the number of the innings in the match.
 Balls denotes the number of balls faced in an innings.
 NR denotes that the number of balls was not recorded.
 Parentheses next to the player's score denotes his century number at the Sydney Cricket Ground.
 The column title Date refers to the date the match started.
 The column title Result refers to whether the player's team won, lost or if the match was drawn.

List of centuries

Test centuries
The following table summarises the Test centuries scored at the Sydney Cricket Ground.

One Day International centuries
The following table summarises the One Day International centuries scored at the Sydney Cricket Ground.

Twenty20 International centuries
The following table summarise the Twenty20 International centuries scored at the Sydney Cricket Ground.

Women's Test centuries
The following table summarises the women's Test centuries scored at the Sydney Cricket Ground.

Women's One Day International centuries
The following table summarises the women's One-Day centuries scored at the Sydney Cricket Ground.

References

External links
 SCG Trust Homepage
 Google Maps satellite image of SCG

Sydney
Cricket grounds in Australia
Syd
Cricket
Sydney Cricket Ground